1903 was the 14th season of County Championship cricket in England. Middlesex won their first title, winning eight and losing one of their 18 games. Yorkshire, the defending champions, finished third after losing five games. Yorkshire was the only team to defeat Middlesex – at Headingley in August, Yorkshire bowled Middlesex out for 79 in the first innings, and recorded a 230-run win.

Honours
County Championship – Middlesex
Minor Counties Championship – Northamptonshire
Wisden – Colin Blythe, John Gunn, Albert Knight, Walter Mead, Plum Warner

County Championship

Final table 
The final County Championship table is shown below. One point was awarded for a win, none for a draw, and minus one for a loss. Positions were decided on percentage of points over completed games.

 1 Games completed

Points system:

 1 for a win
 0 for a draw, a tie or an abandoned match
 -1 for a loss

Most runs in the County Championship

Most wickets in the County Championship

Philadelphians tour

Percy Clark and Bart King headed the wickets for the Philadelphians, who played 14 first-class matches in England, in addition to an abandoned fixture with Sussex. The American tourists won as many matches as they lost, with six of each, and drew two.  Clark upstaged King, passing him on the wicket-taking tally with a pair of five wicket hauls in the final 110-run win over Surrey where King got six wickets. King averaged four runs less per wicket, however, and also contributed with 614 runs, the third-most in the team. In the batting, they were headed by captain John Lester, who made 786 runs in 13 matches.

Overall first-class statistics

Leading batsmen

Leading bowlers

References

Annual reviews
 Wisden Cricketers' Almanack 1904

External links
 Cricket in England in 1903

1903 in English cricket
1903